"Little by Little" is a song co-written and recorded by American country music artist James House.  It was released in November 1994 as the second single from the album Days Gone By.  The song reached #25 on the Billboard  Hot Country Singles & Tracks chart.  The song was written by House and Rick Bowles.

Content
The song is about a man who is getting over a failed relationship "little by little".

Critical reception
A review of the song in Billboard was favorable, comparing House's vocal delivery to Raul Malo while praising the "sonic punch" of the production.

Chart performance

References

1994 singles
1994 songs
James House (singer) songs
Songs written by Rick Bowles
Songs written by James House (singer)
Song recordings produced by Don Cook
Epic Records singles